Blythdale is a rural town and locality in the Maranoa Region, Queensland, Australia.

Geography 
The locality is bounded to the south by the Western railway line with the town served by Blythdale railway station .

The Warrego Highway runs immediately north and parallel to the railway line.

History 
During an attack by Aboriginals near the creek, Blythe was thrown from his horse and speared in the leg. He managed to escape and recovered from his wounds, but the attack caused him to give up the pastoral run. It was then taken up by W.P. Gordon and incorporated into his Wallumbilla pastoral run. Some years later John Christian (of the Hunter River District) purchased Tingun Station and installed his nephew Henry Cardell as his manager and partner. Cardell renamed the pastoral run Blythdale and the creek Blyth Creek in honour of Blythe.

References

External links 
 Town map of Blythdale, 1969

Maranoa Region
Towns in Queensland
Localities in Queensland